Erik Lennart Ahlin (26 July 1916 – 12 July 1995) was a Swedish sports shooter. He competed in the trap event at the 1964 Summer Olympics.

He won the Swedish Championship in skeet shooting in 1959 and in trap shooting in 1964, 1965, and 1966. He also won the Nordic Championship in 1956.

He lived in Vänersborg, where he managed a driving school.

References

External links
 

1916 births
1995 deaths
Swedish male sport shooters
Olympic shooters of Sweden
Shooters at the 1964 Summer Olympics
Sportspeople from Västra Götaland County
20th-century Swedish people